Infamous may refer to:

Arts, entertainment and media

Film and television
 Infamous (2006 film), an American drama film
 Infamous (2020 film), an American crime thriller film
 "Infamous", an episode of Lego Ninjago: Masters of Spinjitzu

Gaming
 Infamous (series), a series of video games 
 Infamous (video game)
 Infamous 2
 Infamous: Festival of Blood
 Infamous Second Son
 Infamous, a stage show and DVD by Derren Brown
 Infamous Gaming, a professional esports organization based in Lima, Peru

Literature
 Infamous (comics), a comic book by DC Comics
 Infamous (novel), in The It Girl series, 2008

Music
 Infamous (Abandon All Ships album), 2012
 Infamous (Motionless in White album), 2012
 The Infamous, a 1995 album by Mobb Deep
 The Infamous Mobb Deep, a 2014 studio album by Mobb Deep

People
Infamous (producer), Marco Rodriguez-Diaz, an American record producer DJ 
 Lord Infamous, Ricky T Dunigan (1973–2013), an American rapper

See also 
 Infamy (disambiguation)
 
 Infamous Mobb, an American hip hop group
 Infamous Syndicate, an American hip hop duo